Scinax rostratus is a species of frog in the family Hylidae. It is found in central Panama and eastward to Colombia (where it is widespread), Venezuela (including the Llanos), and coastal lowlands of Guyana, Suriname, and French Guiana. Common name Caracas snouted treefrog has been coined for this species.

Description
The snout is long. The dorsum varies from grey to brownish to orangish. There is usually a dark brown triangular patch between the eyes, and often some additional dark markings on the back. The arms and legs are barred. The venter is white. In males the throat is dark while it is white in females.

Habitat and conservation
The natural habitats of Scinax rostratus are sub-humid scrubby forests and moist savannas. It is an arboreal species found perched on low vegetation at the edges of temporary or permanent ponds near moist forests. It breeds in temporary ponds. It tolerates some habitat modification. However, habitat loss is a threat to it. It occurs in a number of protected areas.

References

rostratus
Amphibians of Colombia
Amphibians of French Guiana
Amphibians of Guyana
Amphibians of Panama
Amphibians of Suriname
Amphibians of Venezuela
Amphibians described in 1863
Taxa named by Wilhelm Peters
Taxonomy articles created by Polbot